The African Wrestling Championships are amateur wrestling championships. Events are held in men's freestyle wrestling, men's Greco-Roman wrestling and women's freestyle wrestling. In 1996 a tournament for women was held for the first time.

Editions
Not held in 1970, 1972-1980, 1983, 1986-1987, 1991, 1995, 1999.

1979 and 1986 in Alexandria. ?

Medals (1969–2022)

U23

Juniors (U20)

Cadets (U17)
 	2020-02-04 	  	African Championship 	  	Alger (ALG) 	  	Cadets 	  	LL 	 
  	2020-02-04 	  	African Championship 	  	Alger (ALG) 	  	Cadets 	  	LF 	 
  	2020-02-04 	  	African Championship 	  	Alger (ALG) 	  	Cadets 	  	GR 	 
  	2019-03-26 	  	African Championship 	  	Hammamet (TUN) 	  	Cadets 	  	GR 	 
  	2019-03-26 	  	African Championship 	  	Hammamet (TUN) 	  	Cadets 	  	LL 	 
  	2019-03-26 	  	African Championship 	  	Hammamet (TUN) 	  	Cadets 	  	LF 	 
  	2018-02-07 	  	African Championship 	  	Port Harcourt (NGR) 	  	Cadets 	  	LF 	 
  	2018-02-07 	  	African Championship 	  	Port Harcourt (NGR) 	  	Cadets 	  	LL 	 
  	2018-02-07 	  	African Championship 	  	Port Harcourt (NGR) 	  	Cadets 	  	GR 	 
  	2017-04-27 	  	African Championship 	  	Marrakech (MAR) 	  	Cadets 	  	LL 	 
  	2017-04-26 	  	African Championship 	  	Marrakech (MAR) 	  	Cadets 	  	LF 	 
  	2017-04-26 	  	African Championship 	  	Marrakech (MAR) 	  	Cadets 	  	GR 	 
  	2016-06-15 	  	African Championship 	  	Algiers (ALG) 	  	Cadets 	  	LL 	 
  	2016-06-15 	  	African Championship 	  	Algiers (ALG) 	  	Cadets 	  	LF 	 
  	2016-06-15 	  	African Championship 	  	Algiers (ALG) 	  	Cadets 	  	GR 	 
  	2015-05-27 	  	African Championship 	  	Alexandria (EGY) 	  	Cadets 	  	LF 	 
  	2015-05-27 	  	African Championship 	  	Alexandria (EGY) 	  	Cadets 	  	GR 	 
  	2015-05-27 	  	African Championship 	  	Alexandria (EGY) 	  	Cadets 	  	LL 	 
  	2014-05-19 	  	African Championship 	  	Alexandria (EGY) 	  	Cadets 	  	GR 	 
  	2014-05-19 	  	African Championship 	  	Alexandria (EGY) 	  	Cadets 	  	LF 	 
  	2014-05-19 	  	African Championship 	  	Alexandria (EGY) 	  	Cadets 	  	LL 	 
  	2012-06-14 	  	African Championship 	  	Antananarivo (MAD) 	  	Cadets 	  	LF 	 
  	2012-06-14 	  	African Championship 	  	Antananarivo (MAD) 	  	Cadets 	  	GR 	 
  	2012-06-14 	  	African Championship 	  	Antananarivo (MAD) 	  	Cadets 	  	LL 	 
  	2011-07-07 	  	African Championship 	  	Alger - Staouali (ALG) 	  	Cadets 	  	GR 	 
  	2011-07-07 	  	African Championship 	  	Alger - Staouali (ALG) 	  	Cadets 	  	LL 	 
  	2011-07-07 	  	African Championship 	  	Alger - Staouali (ALG) 	  	Cadets 	  	LF 	 
  	2010-04-23 	  	African Championship 	  	Cairo (EGY) 	  	Cadets 	  	LL 	 
  	2010-04-22 	  	African Championship 	  	Cairo (EGY) 	  	Cadets 	  	GR 	 
  	2010-04-22 	  	African Championship 	  	Cairo (EGY) 	  	Cadets 	  	LF 	 
  	2009-07-05 	  	African Championship 	  	Tipaza (ALG) 	  	Cadets 	  	GR 	 
  	2009-07-05 	  	African Championship 	  	Tipaza (ALG) 	  	Cadets 	  	LF 	 
  	2009-07-05 	  	African Championship 	  	Tipaza (ALG) 	  	Cadets 	  	LL

See also
 Wrestling at the African Games

References

 
Wrestling competitions
Wrestling